The Monte Alto photovoltaic power plant in Spain has a generating capacity of 9.55 megawatts peak (MWp) and will generate 14 million kilowatt-hours of electricity per annum.  It cost 65 million euros [US$87 million].

The installation covers an area of 51 hectares on agricultural land near the locality of Milagro (Navarre) and contains 889 solar structures, of which 864 are equipped with automated solar tracking. The rest are fixed structures adapted to the relief of the terrain.

In five years Acciona Energy has developed seven "solar gardens" in Navarre with a total capacity of 20 MWp, and another two are under construction in Castilla-La Mancha. Overall, the company's installed capacity is 23 megawatts (MW), through the approximately 3,000 automated solar monitoring structures, and represents a total investment of 177 million euros [US$236 million] shared among more than 2,000 owners. The yield from these investments is somewhere between 8 and 10% and the payback of the investment is estimated at around 10 years.

See also

Photovoltaics
Renewable energy in the European Union
Solar power in Spain

References

Photovoltaic power stations in Spain